Oreocossus grzimeki is a species of moth of the family Cossidae. It is found in Kenya.

References

Moths described in 2011
Zeuzerinae